Eupithecia cauchiata is a moth of the family Geometridae. It is found from the Pyrenees to the Ural. In the north, the range extends to the southern coast of Finland.

The wingspan is 18–22 mm. Adults are on wing from mid May to the end of July.

The larvae feed on the leaves of Solidago virgaurea. Larvae can be found from July to September. The species overwinters in the pupal stage, sometimes they overwinter twice.

References

External links
Les Carnets du Lépidoptériste Français 
Lepiforum.de
schmetterlinge-deutschlands.de

Moths described in 1831
cauchiata
Moths of Europe
Taxa named by Philogène Auguste Joseph Duponchel